High Class Trash is the first EP and third release overall by Chicago based hard rock band The Last Vegas, released on July 1, 2007.

This EP was the band's first self-released release, as it was after the band split from their previous label Get Hip Records. The EP was released especially to spotlight the song "Raw Dog" (credited here as Raw Dog Master), from the band's previous album Seal the Deal, which was featured earlier in the successful game Guitar Hero II.

It is the band's first release with new singer Chad Cherry.

Track listing

Personnel
Chad Cherry - lead vocals
Adam Arling - guitar
Johnny Wator – guitar
Anthony Rubino – bass
Nate Arling - drums, percussion

References

2007 EPs
The Last Vegas albums